The 2019 Hartford Athletic season is the club's inaugural season and their first in the USL Championship, the second tier of American soccer. The season covers the period from the founding of the club to the start of the 2020 USL Championship season.

Roster

Non-competitive

Preseason
Although a preseason schedule was not officially announced ahead of time, Hartford played four preseason matches ahead of the club's inaugural season. After opening preseason in Farmington, Connecticut and playing a behind closed doors friendly against New York Red Bulls II, Hartford announced three matches to be played while the club trained in Melbourne, Florida. Hartford played matches against USL League One club Orlando City B, National Premier Soccer League club Miami FC, and collegiate program Eastern Florida State College.

Exhibition

Competitive

USL Championship

Standings

Results by round

Match results
The league announced home openers for every club on December 14, 2018. The inaugural home match in Hartford Athletic history was scheduled for May 4, with the club facing Charlotte Independence; although it was initially anticipated that the game would be played at Dillon Stadium, it and six other home matches were later moved to Rentschler Field due to construction delays. Hartford were to take part in the home openers for four other clubs, facing Atlanta United 2 on March 9, Louisville City on March 23, Indy Eleven on March 30, and Pittsburgh Riverhounds SC on April 13.

Hartford Athletic's full schedule was released on December 19. The club's inaugural season will consist of 34 league matches, including home and away games against every Eastern Conference opponent. Hartford will be one of six new teams in the Eastern Conference: Birmingham Legion, Loudoun United, and Memphis 901 are also joining as expansion clubs, while Saint Louis FC and Swope Park Rangers move over from the Western Conference.

U.S. Open Cup

As a member of the USL Championship, Hartford Athletic will enter the tournament in the Second Round, to be played May 14–15, 2019.

Statistics

Appearances and goals

|-
|colspan=10 align=center|Players who left Hartford during the season:

|}

Disciplinary record

Clean sheets

Transfers

In

Loan in

Loan out

Awards

USLC Goal of the Week

Kits

See also
 Hartford Athletic
 2019 in American soccer
 2019 USL Championship season

References

Hartford Athletic
Hartford Athletic
Hartford Athletic
Hartford Athletic